"FCC Song" is a deliberately controversial and explicit song by British-born Monty Python comic Eric Idle. Idle, who later became a resident of the U.S. state of California, recorded the song in early 2004 in reaction to a fine by the U.S. Federal Communications Commission (FCC) for saying "fuck" on a radio station. The song is also known by its refrain "fuck you very much". Despite being nominally aimed at the FCC, the lyrics primarily target well-known figures associated with the George W. Bush administration, including Dick Cheney and John Ashcroft among others. Idle stated about the song that

"...it's dedicated to the FCC and if they broadcast it, it will cost a quarter of a million dollars".

Idle has made the song freely available for download at the Monty Python website. The lyrics' strong anti-Republican stance has prompted numerous anti-Bush websites to link to the song or to mirror it. The word "fuck" occurs 14 times in the song; the words "bitch" and "dickhead" also appear in the song one time each.

An earlier song, "I Bet You They Won't Play This Song on the Radio", written and performed by Idle on Monty Python's Contractual Obligation Album (1980), touched on this subject, but with two major differences: It limited its scorn to radio programmers and it bleeped (using various sound effects) the various obscenities. Accordingly, many programmers did indeed play that song on the radio.

See also
 Obscenity
 Decency
 Profanity
 Censorship in the United States
 Freedom of speech in the United States
 First Amendment to the United States Constitution
 Seven dirty words
 "Fuck You" (Lily Allen song)
 "Fuck You" (CeeLo Green song)

External links 
 Official Monty Python site
 Tweet of new version

References

2004 songs
American songs
British songs
Comedy songs
Federal Communications Commission
Off-color humor
Protest songs
Songs about radio
Songs written by Eric Idle
Songs about censorship